The 1912 United States presidential election in Missouri took place on November 5, 1912, as part of the 1912 United States presidential election. Voters chose 18 representatives, or electors, to the Electoral College, who voted for president and vice president.

Missouri was won by governor of New Jersey Woodrow Wilson (D), running with governor of Indiana Thomas R. Marshall, with 47.35% of the popular vote, against the 27th president of the United States William Howard Taft (R–Ohio), running with Columbia University President Nicholas Murray Butler, with 29.75% of the popular vote and the 26th president of the United States Theodore Roosevelt (P–New York), running with governor of California Hiram Johnson, with 17.80% of the popular vote. , this is the last election in which Douglas County and Ozark County did not vote for the Republican Presidential candidate.

Results

Results by county

See also
 United States presidential elections in Missouri

Notes

References

Missouri
1912
1912 Missouri elections